Benjamin Gordon (born November 29, 1970) is an American professional stock car racing driver.

Racing career

Early career
Prior to moving up to NASCAR's big leagues, Gordon competed in the NASCAR-sanctioned Slim Jim All Pro Series in the late 1990s and early 2000s. Good runs in the series allowed him to move up to the USAR Hooters Pro Cup Series, where he was Rookie of the Year in 2003.  He went on to win the Northern Division in four of the following five seasons, except for 2007 where he finished second.  He would add overall series championships in 2005 and 2008. His brother Todd would serve as his crew chief, before joining the NASCAR ranks as a crew chief for Team Penske.

NASCAR
Gordon's first NASCAR national touring series race was in the Camping World Truck Series (then Craftsman Truck Series) in 2007 at the Milwaukee Mile, where he finished 15th.  It was his only Truck Series start that season.  He returned for one more Truck Series start the following year, finishing 31st at Mansfield Motorsports Park, a track where he has won multiple USAR races.

In 2009, Gordon left USARacing full-time to enter his own team in the Nationwide Series.  Driving the No. 72 Ford Fusion, he has made six starts and finished in the top 20 twice, with a best finish of 12th at Iowa Speedway.

After making one start in the series in 2011, Gordon returned to the Nationwide Series in 2012, driving the No. 24 SR² Motorsports Toyota on a part-time basis. He finished 12th in the series' season-opening race at Daytona International Speedway; he filed to run for Rookie of the Year in the series shortly thereafter. However, without sponsorship, Gordon moved to the position of crew chief, hiring other sponsored drivers to drive the No. 24; for 2013, he was promoted to team manager and lead crew chief for the SR² team.

SR² Motorsports shut down after 2013, leaving Gordon without work. He made one attempt in the Nationwide Series in 2014, failing to qualify the TriStar Motorsports No. 91 car at Daytona in July. In 2015, Gordon entered the season without a ride, but with the closure of Vision Racing, Gordon bought the team's assets and rebranded the team as PEG Racing. Gordon finished 13th in his first attempt at Talladega. Gordon also finished in the top-five at the Subway Firecracker 250 at Daytona in the same year. It was Gordon's best finish since Daytona in 2012. It was also Gordon's first top-five and -ten finish. Gordon later made three races including Bristol, Richmond, and Chicagoland but the results were poor. In 2016, Gordon drove one race for TriStar Motorsports in the No. 14 Toyota Camry at Daytona, and finished 35th due to a transmission issue.

Motorsports career results

NASCAR
(key) (Bold – Pole position awarded by qualifying time. Italics – Pole position earned by points standings or practice time. * – Most laps led.)

Xfinity Series

Craftsman Truck Series

K&N Pro Series East

 Season still in progress
 Ineligible for series points

ARCA Racing Series
(key) (Bold – Pole position awarded by qualifying time. Italics – Pole position earned by points standings or practice time. * – Most laps led.)

References

External links
 
 
 
 

Living people
1970 births
People from DuBois, Pennsylvania
Racing drivers from Pennsylvania
NASCAR drivers
CARS Tour drivers
ARCA Menards Series drivers